The adjective data-driven means that progress in an activity is compelled by data, rather than by intuition or by personal experience.

Data-driven may refer to:

 Data-driven programming, computer programming in which program statements describe data to be matched and the processing required
 Data-driven journalism, a journalistic process based on analyzing and filtering large data sets,
 Data-driven testing, computer software testing done using a table of conditions directly as test inputs and verifiable outputs
 Data-driven learning, a learning approach driven by research-like access to data
 Data-driven science, an interdisciplinary field of scientific methods to extract knowledge from data
 Data-driven control systems, systems of automatic control based on system identification 
 Data-driven security, a form of model-driven security
 Data-driven marketing, a form of digital marketing
Data-driven company, a form of company management based at data analysis

See also
 
 Data (disambiguation)

Neologisms